Elon Musk: Tesla, SpaceX, and the Quest for a Fantastic Future is Ashlee Vance's biography of Elon Musk, published in 2015. The book traces Elon Musk's life from his childhood up to the time he spent at Zip2 and PayPal, and then onto SpaceX, Tesla, and SolarCity. In the book, Vance managed to get regular interviews with Musk, those close to him, and those who were with him at the most important points of his life; Musk had no control over the biography's contents.

Reception
The Washington Post wrote that "the book is a tremendous look into arguably the world's most important entrepreneur. Vance paints an unforgettable picture of Musk's unique personality, insatiable drive and ability to thrive through hardship." Dwight Garner, writing in The New York Times, wrote, "Mr. Vance delivers a well-calibrated portrait of Mr. Musk, so that we comprehend both his friends and his enemies. It's a book with many ancillary pleasures. Mr. Vance brings us up to date on the states of green energy and space launches. He also veers away from his subject just often enough, offering profiles of the frequently brilliant people who work alongside Mr. Musk. The best thing Mr. Vance does in this book, though, is tell Mr. Musk's story simply and well." It was declared one of the best books of 2015 by The Wall Street Journal, NPR, Amazon.com, Fast Company and Audible.

See also
 How to Make a Spaceship (2016 book) by Julian Guthrie, about the Ansari X Prize
 The Right Stuff (1979 book) by Tom Wolfe, about the U.S. side of the Space Race

References

Elon Musk
2015 non-fiction books
HarperCollins books